Loch Rusky is a small freshwater loch near Callander in the Stirling council area in Scottish Highlands.

Geography 
The lake lies in the Registration County of Perthshire. 
The loch lies to the east of the Mentieth Hills, about 6 km northeast of the Port of Menteith.  The Torrie Forest extends over Lennieston Muir to the east.

Toponymy 
The name Rusky derives from the Gaelic Loch an Rusgaidh, meaning "Lake of the Shearing"or "Lake of the Turf/Peat".

Fishing 
Loch Rusky is well-known since the 19th century for a good stock of pike and perch.

Update - from the 1960s to the present day, the loch has been a trout fishery (fly only) from a boat.  There are no pike or perch in the loch.

Footnotes

Rusky
Protected areas of Stirling (council area)
Rusky